Ullman is a surname. Notable people with the surname include:

Al Ullman (1914–1986), American politician
Berthold Ullman (1882–1965), American classical scholar
Edward Ullman (1912–1976), American geographer
Ellen Ullman, American author
Elwood Ullman (1903–1985), American film comedy writer
Eugene Paul Ullman (1877-1953) American Impressionist painter
Harlan K. Ullman (born 1941), American political author and commentator
James Ramsey Ullman (1907–1971), American writer and mountaineer
Jeffrey Ullman (born 1942), American computer scientist
Johan Ullman (born 1953), Swedish inventor
Jordan Ullman, part of the duo Majid Jordan
Leslie Ullman (born 1947), an American poet
Liv Ullman (born 1938), American Actress
Micha Ullman (born 1939), an Israeli sculptor, professor of art
Michael T. Ullman (born 1962), American neuroscientist
Montague Ullman (1916–2008), American psychiatrist and parapsychologist
Norm Ullman (born 1935), Canadian ice hockey forward
Raviv Ullman (born 1986), Israeli-American actor
Samuel Ullman (1840–1924), German-American poet
Shimon Ullman (born 1948), Israeli computer scientist 
Torsten Ullman (1908–1993), Swedish pistol shooter
Tracey Ullman (born 1959), British-American actress

See also
Poe v. Ullman, a United States Supreme Court case
Sethi–Ullman algorithm, in computing, named after Jeffrey Ullman
Ullmann
Ulman